The government agencies in Sweden are state-controlled organizations that act independently to carry out the policies of the Government of Sweden. The ministries are relatively small and merely policy-making organizations, allowed to monitor the agencies and preparing decision and policy papers for the government as a collective body to decide upon. 

A Cabinet Minister is explicitly prohibited from interfering with the day-to-day operation in an agency or the outcome in individual cases. The cardinal rule is that Ministers are not allowed to issue orders to agencies in their portfolio personally (with only a few exceptions) as the government agencies are subject to decisions made by the government, although the government cannot even directly overrule an agency in the handling of an individual case.

Other than the executive branch, the Riksdag also has a number of independent agencies.

Riksdag 

Riksbank, Sweden's central bank.
National Audit Office — the supreme audit institution of Sweden.
The Parliamentary Ombudsman.

Ministry of Justice

Ministry for Foreign Affairs

Ministry of Defence

Ministry of Employment

Ministry of Enterprise and Innovation

Ministry of Health and Social Affairs

Ministry of Finance

Ministry of Education and Research

Ministry of Culture

Ministry of the Environment

Ministry of Infrastructure 

Svenska kraftnät
Electrical Safety Board
Energy Markets Inspectorate
Civil Aviation Administration
Agency for Digital Government
Oil Crisis Board
Post and Telecom Authority
Maritime Administration
Energy Agency
Road and Transport Research Institute
Transport Analysis
Transport Administration
Transport Agency

Defunct agencies 
Some historic government agencies have been merged with other agencies or simply closed down.

Aliens Appeals Board of Sweden, or Utlänningsnämnden, UN. Discontinued and replaced by Migration Courts on 31 March 2006, when the new Aliens Act entered into force.
Swedish National Board of Education, or Skolöverstyrelsen, governed primary and secondary schools. Was replaced by the Swedish National Agency for Education in 1991 when the responsibility for schools was transferred from the state to the municipalities.
Swedish National Board of Universities and Colleges, or Universitets- och högskoleämbetet, was responsible for higher education until 1992 when the central agency was abolished. It was replaced with an agency with a considerably more limited field of operations, the Office of the Chancellor of the Swedish Universities, or Kanslersämbetet. The Swedish National Agency for Higher Education was set up on 1 July 1995, incorporating the Office of the Chancellor, the Council for the Renewal of Undergraduate Education (Grundutbildningsrådet) and parts of the Swedish National Agency for Services to Universities.
Swedish National Integration Board, or Integrationsverket. Located in Norrköping. Field of operations: The Swedish Integration Board to ensure that the visions and goals of Sweden's integration policies have an impact in the various areas of society. Closed down on 1 July 2007.
Swedish National Plant Variety Board, or Statens växtsortnämnd. Field of operations: issues relating to plant breeding and the admission of plants into the different classification lists. Made a part of the Swedish National Board of Agriculture on 1 January 2006.
Swedish National Public Transport Agency, or Rikstrafiken on 1 April 2010.
The Railway Safety Fencing Board was a government agency responsible for settling conflicts between municipalities and rail transport companies regarding the building of fences along railways. The board existed 1976—2008. It only decided in one case, which occurred in 1977.
Swedish Seed Testing and Certification Institute, or Statens utsädeskontroll. Field of operations: seed testing. Made a part of the Swedish National Board of Agriculture on 1 January 2006.
The State Institute for Racial Biology or Statens institut för rasbiologi. Field of operations: studying eugenics and human genetics. Established in 1922 and changed to State Institute for Human Genetics in 1958 and merged into Uppsala University.

See also 
List of Swedish government enterprises
 Government agencies in Iceland
 Government agencies in Norway

References

 Current Government Agencies on Government's website
 Governmental ordinance (in Swedish) listing agencies affiliation per ministry

 
Sweden
Lists of organizations based in Sweden